Eosaster is a monotypic genus of echinoderms belonging to the family Goniasteridae. The only species is Eosaster nadiae.

The species is found in Pacific Ocean (near Australia).

References

Goniasteridae
Monotypic echinoderm genera